The Bank of Napa, at 903 Main St. and 908 Brown St. in Napa, California was built in 1923.  It was listed on the National Register of Historic Places in 1992.

It is a two-story building stretching for a block, consisting of an original Classical Revival-style commercial building built in 1923 plus a large stuccoed Art Deco annex added in 1934.

References

Banks based in California
National Register of Historic Places in Napa County, California
Neoclassical architecture in California
Art Deco architecture in California
Commercial buildings completed in 1923